Roanhead (sometimes spelled Ronhead) refers to the limestone outcrop of Roanhead Crag in Cumbria and the farmland behind it, but in recent years the term has been taken to mean the sandy beaches adjoining Sandscale Haws extending to Snab Point. 
The Irish Sea lies to the west of Roanhead, whilst the Duddon Estuary and Walney Channel are due north and south respectively. The beach is noted for its abundance of sand dunes and strong, often dangerous coastal currents. Today the beach is a National Trust conservation area, and a two-mile stretch of the Cumbria Coastal Way runs through it.

Mining
 
There are signs of shotholes on Roanhead Crag, indicating that, like Dunnerholme, it has been quarried for limestone at some time.  There is a small limekiln near the National Trust depot, one of two on the estate.

Myles Kennedy leased the mining rights from Thomas Sandys in 1852.  There may have been an earlier takenote but there is no sign of mining on the Roanhead estate on the 1850 OS map.  The firm of Kennedy Brothers worked the iron mines until the last of the ore was taken from Nigel pit in July 1942  The Nigel mine alone is said to have produced 11 million tons of ore.  It was one of several deposits on the estate.  The farmhouse was moved to its present site shortly after the discovery of the Nigel deposit in 1902.

The mines left a series of subsidence craters which are now flooded.  Along with the ponds left by Park mines, they are managed as fishing ponds by Furness Fishing Association.

See also
 List of beaches

References

External links
 Environment Agency: Roan Head Bathing Water Profile

Beaches of Cumbria
Headlands of England
Tourist attractions in Barrow-in-Furness
Defunct mining companies of the United Kingdom
Landforms of Cumbria